The Essential Johnny Cash is a double-compact disc compilation by Johnny Cash released as part of Sony BMG's Essential series. It was compiled to commemorate Cash's 70th birthday. It is not to be confused with the three-CD box set of the same name released by Columbia Records in 1992.

The double album concentrates mainly on Cash's first 15 years as a recording artist with Sun Records and Columbia, contains only eight post-1970 selections, and no selections from Cash's work with Rick Rubin for American Recordings:  Cash's final hit single, a cover of Nine Inch Nails' "Hurt", was released ten months later. The album was certified gold and platinum on February 5, 2005 and was certified 3× platinum on March 3, 2016 for sales of 1,500,000 copies by the RIAA.  It has sold 1,845,400 copies in the US as of October 2019.

Amongst the 36 tracks on the compilation are two songs that feature Cash prominently but are from other artists' albums: "Girl from the North Country" from Bob Dylan's 1969 album Nashville Skyline, and "The Wanderer" from U2's 1993 album Zooropa.

As a tribute to Cash's influence on country, rock, and other modern musics and his wide fan base, the liner notes feature testimonials and 70th birthday greetings from an array of artists – from friends and collaborators like Willie Nelson, Kris Kristofferson, Tom Petty, ex-stepson-in-law Nick Lowe, and wife June Carter Cash, and also from Keith Richards, Elvis Costello, Corey Taylor and Shawn Crahan of Slipknot, Metallica's Kirk Hammett, and Henry Rollins.

Track listing

2015 Vinyl Reissue
A vinyl edition of The Essential Johnny Cash was released in 2015 as a double LP. The vinyl release reduces the track list to 28 songs, compared to the 36 on the standard CD release.

Testimonials
The following people provided testimonials and/or 70th birthday greetings for the CD's liner notes (in this order):

June Carter Cash
Willie Nelson
Kris Kristofferson
Merle Haggard
George Jones
Rosanne Cash
Rodney Crowell
Paul McCartney
Bono (of U2)
The Edge (of U2)
Leonard Cohen
John Mellencamp

Raul Malo (of The Mavericks)
Dave Matthews
Tom Waits
Chrissie Hynde
Keith Richards
Tom Petty
Elvis Costello
Ray Davies
Nick Lowe
Sam Shepard
Billy Bob Thornton
Matt McDonough (of Mudvayne)

Shawn Crahan (of Slipknot)
Corey Taylor (of Slipknot and Stone Sour)
Kirk Hammett (of Metallica)
Henry Rollins
Shelby Lynne
Al Gore
Nick Cave
Trisha Yearwood
Steve Earle
Tim Robbins

Charts

Weekly charts

Year-end charts

Certifications

References

Albums produced by Flood (producer)
Albums produced by Bob Johnston
Albums produced by Brian Eno
2002 greatest hits albums
Johnny Cash compilation albums
Columbia Records compilation albums
Legacy Recordings compilation albums